Piri Thomas (born Juan Pedro Tomas; September 30, 1928 – October 17, 2011) was a Puerto Rican-Cuban writer and poet whose memoir Down These Mean Streets became a best-seller.

Early years
Thomas was born to a Puerto Rican mother and Cuban father. His childhood neighborhood in the Spanish Harlem section of New York City was riddled with crime and violence. According to Thomas, children were expected to be gang members at a young age, and Thomas was no exception.  Thomas was also exposed to racial discrimination because of his Afro-Latino heritage.

Thomas was involved with drugs, gang warfare and crime. While spending seven years in prison for an attempted armed robbery, Thomas reflected on the teachings of his mother and father, and realized that a person is not born a criminal. Consequently, he decided to use his street and prison know-how to reach at-risk youth, and to help them avoid a life of crime.

Down These Mean Streets
In 1967, Thomas received funds from the Rabinowitz Foundation to write and publish his best-selling autobiography Down These Mean Streets. The book describes his struggle for survival as a Puerto Rican/Cuban born and raised in the barrios of New York. The book, which has been in print for 52 years, was banned in some places but also required reading, depending on the time and place. He narrated the rampant racism of the pre-Civil Rights Act of 1964. His other works include Savior, Savior Hold My Hand; Seven Long Times; and Stories from El Barrio. with el primo

Later years
Thomas was an influential precursor to the Nuyorican Movement which included poets Pedro Pietri, Miguel Algarín, and Giannina Braschi, who wrote of life in New York City using a mix of English and Spanish. Thomas worked on a book titled A Matter of Dignity and on an educational film entitled Dialogue with Society.

Thomas traveled around the U.S., Central America and Europe, giving lectures and conducting workshops in colleges and universities. He was the subject of the film Every Child is Born a Poet: The Life and Work of Piri Thomas, by Jonathan Robinson, which featured a soundtrack by Kip Hanrahan.

On October 17, 2011, Thomas died from pneumonia at his home in El Cerrito, California. He was survived by his wife Suzie Dod Thomas, six children, and three stepchildren.

See also

Nuyorican
List of Puerto Ricans
List of Puerto Rican writers
Puerto Rican literature
List of Cuban American writers
List of Cuban Americans
American Literature in Spanish
Latino literature

References

1928 births
2011 deaths
Writers from Manhattan
American male poets
American people of Puerto Rican descent
Deaths from pneumonia in California
Hispanic and Latino American autobiographers
American autobiographers
20th-century American poets
20th-century American male writers
20th-century American non-fiction writers
American male non-fiction writers
People from East Harlem